A Winter Symphony is a Christmas album from the English soprano singer Sarah Brightman, released in November 2008.

Album information
The album borrows its name from Brightman's earlier 2008 album, Symphony.

A deluxe edition was released through Barnes & Noble, which included extra tracks and a DVD that featured documentary segments: "The Making of A Winter Symphony", a photo gallery, and Brightman's live performances of "Fleurs du Mal", "Symphony", "Let It Rain", and "Running" from NBC's Fashion on Ice Show.

Brightman chose a number of traditional songs from the season: "Silent Night", "In the Bleak Midwinter", and "Child in a Manger", as well as two versions of "Ave Maria", one being the classical piece by French composer Charles Gounod, and the other—in duet with tenor Fernando Lima—an original by Brightman and Mexican composer Jorge Avedaño. Included are also contemporary pop tunes, such as Vince Gill's "Colder Than Winter", a cover of Neil Diamond's "I've Been This Way Before" and Roy Wood's "I Wish It Could Be Christmas Everyday". The set continues with a rendition of "Amazing Grace" and closes with a reading of "I Believe in Father Christmas" originally by Emerson, Lake & Palmer.

To promote the album, in the week of 15–22 December, Brightman's "Silent Night" was the iTunes "Free Single of the Week" and the video for "I Believe in Father Christmas" was launched to accompany the single. Brightman also performed at the "Walt Disney World Christmas Day Parade", performing "Silent Night" on 23 December 2008, and it was broadcast by ABC on 25 December 2008.

A Winter Symphony won Classical Album of the Year at the 23rd Japan Gold Disc Awards.

Track listing

Singles
 "Silent Night (iTunes only)" (2008)
 "I Believe in Father Christmas/I Wish It Could Be Christmas Everyday (promo-only)" (2008)

Chart performance 

Selling about 14,000 copies in the first week in the United States, the album debuted at number thirty-eight on the Billboard Top 200. It also made another debuts such as the Top Classical Crossover Albums at number-three; It scored a number six in the Top Holiday Albums, being the first entry for Brightman on this chart and debuted at number-four on the Top Internet Albums. In Japan, the album debuted in the top 15, peaking at No. 12 selling 13,953 copies in its first week of release.

Charts

Certifications

References 

Sarah Brightman albums
Albums produced by Frank Peterson
Christmas albums by English artists
Manhattan Records albums
2008 Christmas albums
Pop Christmas albums
Classical Christmas albums
Classical crossover albums